Kimberlyn Duncan (born August 2, 1991) is an American track and field athlete, specializing in the sprints.  She was the 2013 American champion at 200 metres, having defeated Olympic champion Allyson Felix with a strong stretch run.  Her time of 21.80 seconds from that race at the 2013 USA Outdoor Track and Field Championships would have ranked her as the 14th fastest female of all time, had it not been wind aided. She was 42nd on that 2013 list, from a qualifying heat at the NCAA Championships on the same Drake Stadium track a year earlier.

Duncan was a standout athlete at Cypress Springs High School near her hometown in Katy, Texas, graduating in 2009. She ran track collegiately at Louisiana State University, where she became the first woman to win the NCAA Championships 200 meters back to back, both indoors and outdoors.

She is the 2012 recipient of The Bowerman, the highest award for a collegiate track and field athlete. She won the Honda Sports Award as the nation's best female track and field competitor in 2011 and repeated in 2012.

At the 2012 NACAC Under-23 Championships in Athletics she again won the 200 meters in record time and anchored the victorious USA 4x100 metres relay team. A few weeks later, she anchored the USA "Blue" team to the meet record at Herculis.

At 2013 USA Outdoor Track and Field Championships, Duncan earned gold medal in the 200 meters and placed 21st in the 100 meters.

At 2014 USA Outdoor Track and Field Championships, Duncan earned silver medal in the 200 meters.

At 2015 Mt SAC Relays, Duncan's 200 meter time has her ranked 31st in the world. Duncan finished 16th in 100 metres and 10th in 200 metres 2015 USA Outdoor Track and Field Championships.

Duncan finished 21st in 100 metres and 35th in 200 metres at the 2016 United States Olympic Trials (track and field).

Duncan finished 9th in 100 metres and 2nd in 200 metres at the 2017 USA Outdoor Track and Field Championships.

USA Track and field National Championships

IAAF World championships

References

1991 births
Living people
People from Katy, Texas
Track and field athletes from Houston
American female sprinters
African-American female track and field athletes
LSU Lady Tigers track and field athletes
World Athletics Championships athletes for the United States
LSU Tigers track and field athletes
Louisiana State University alumni
USA Outdoor Track and Field Championships winners
21st-century African-American sportspeople
21st-century African-American women